AMC+ is an American subscription video on demand streaming service owned by AMC Networks that was launched on June 11, 2020. The service is a premium bundle that includes the live feeds and program libraries of the company's television networks and streaming brands along with its own exclusive content.

History 
AMC+ was first launched in June 11, 2020 for Xfinity customers, and included content that was previously exclusive to subscribers of the AMC cable channel through its TV Everywhere AMC Premiere app. On October 1, 2020, AMC+ launched on Amazon Prime Video Channels and Apple TV Channels, and became available to Dish Network and Sling TV customers. On November 23, 2020, AMC+ launched on Roku. On April 6, 2021, AMC+ became available on YouTube TV. On the same month, AMC+ launched on DirecTV. In August 2021, AMC+ finally launched on TV, computer and mobile devices.

Former BBC America executive director Courtney Thomasma was named general manager of AMC+ on April 8, 2021. Thomasma reports to Miguel Penella, AMC Networks’ President of Subscription Video on Demand (SVOD).

Content
AMC+ primarily features content from AMC, BBC America, IFC, Sundance TV, Shudder, IFC Films Unlimited, and Sundance Now. The service features early access to original series (such as AMC's The Walking Dead franchise), with new episodes offered a week before their cable television premieres. The service also includes exclusive films that are released every Friday, with some titles getting the simultaneous release with its parent company, including RLJE Films and IFC Films/IFC Midnight. AMC+ in Australia, Spain and India includes Acorn TV.

Current and upcoming exclusive series
 The Walking Dead
 Fear the Walking Dead
 Gangs of London
 Kin
 Firebite
 That Dirty Black Bag
 This Is Going to Hurt
 61st Street
 Moonhaven
 Tales of the Walking Dead
 Dark Winds
 The Ipcress File
 Interview with the Vampire
 Ultra City Smiths
 Mayfair Witches (2023)
 Orphan Black Echoes (2023)
 The Walking Dead: Dead City (2023)
 Parish (2023)

Exclusive films
 Archenemy
 Apex
 No Man of God
 Prisoners of the Ghostland
 South of Heaven
 Silent Night
 Warning
 Survive the Game
 The Tax Collector
 Dangerous
 Clean
 Catch the Fair One
 Dual
 A Banquet
 White Elephant
 I Am Mortal
 Revealer
 Barbarians
 Last Looks
 Paris, 13th District
 Happening
 The Reef: Stalked
 Rogue Agent
 Spin Me Round
 Section Eight

Availability and distribution
The service launched in Canada on Amazon's Prime Video and Apple TV in August 2021, ahead of the premiere of the eleventh season of The Walking Dead. Some content on the U.S. version of the service has not been made available in Canada due to varying programming rights.

The service launched in Australia as a channel on Prime Video and Apple TV as well in November 2021, which include Acorn TV on the package.

In March 2022, AMC+ launched in India via Apple TV Channels, including Acorn TV. In June, the service also launched on Prime Video.

The service is expected to be launched in New Zealand, Latin America and several European countries over 2022 and into 2023. 

In October 2022, AMC+ launched in New Zealand with a bundle option including access to both Acorn TV and Shudder. Also in the same month, KT has including AMC+ into their newly rebrand Genie TV as one-stop Live TV & VOD platform..

Reception
Stephen Silver of Make Use Of noted the "impressive amount of content on offer from AMC+" and its "winning combination of shows you know, new ones to discover, and a large library of movies."

Notes

References

External links

AMC Networks
Internet television streaming services
Subscription video on demand services
Internet properties established in 2020